The Osmonds Live is the first live album by The Osmonds and was released in 1972. It reached No. 13 on the Billboard 200 on July 29, 1972.  The album was certified Gold by the RIAA on December 30, 1972.

Track listing

Personnel
Producer: Alan Osmond, Michael Lloyd
Engineer: Ed Greene
Anthony Loew, Sam Emerson - photography
Recorded in concert at the Forum, Los Angeles, California, December 4, 1971

Charts

Album

Certifications

References

1972 live albums
The Osmonds albums
MGM Records live albums
Albums recorded at the Forum